The Tuman River is a river in Kashgar Prefecture, Xinjiang, China. The name comes from the Uyghur word "tuman" meaning "fog". The Tuman is a minor tributary of the Tarim Basin. The oasis city of Kashgar is located on the Tuman's south bank.

References

External links
Picture of the Tuman River

Rivers of Xinjiang